Jalan Datin Halimah (Johor state road J3) or Jalan Kolam Ayer is a major road in Johor Bahru, Johor, Malaysia. It was named after wife of Menteri Besar of JohoJohorato' Onn Jaafar, Datin Halimah.

List of interchanges

Roads in Johor Bahru